Haliclona submonilifera, or the bubble bead sponge, is a deep-water demosponge from the continental shelf and slope off south-west Africa.

Description 
This straw yellow sponge grows upright, with stalked branches that have numerous swellings and constrictions. These branches end with rounded ends with distinct oscules. Oscules  may also occur on rounded elevations along the branches. The surface has a velventy texture. This sponge is very flexible and compressible and is easily torn. It looks incredibly similar to Haliclona (Haliclona) urizae, another Namibian sponge species, but differs in having megascleres with blunt or rounded edges. More samples are needed to determine whether these are in actuality two different species or not.

Distribution and habitat 
This species occurs along the continental shelf and slope off south-west Africa.

References 

Haliclona
Chalinidae